Karel Steklý (9 October 1903 – 5 July 1987) was a Czech film director. He is most famous for his film Siréna (1947) for which he won the Golden Lion, and The Good Soldier Schweik (1957).

Filmography

Prosťáček (1945)
Průlom (1946)
Siréna (1947)
Kariéra (1948)
Soudný den (1949)
Internacionála  (1950)
Temno (1950)
Anna Proletářka (1953)
Strakonický dudák (1955)
The Good Soldier Schweik (1956)
Poslušně hlásím (1957)
Mstitel (1959)
Objev na Střapaté hůrce (1962)
Lucie (1963)
Zkáza Jeruzaléma (1964)
Slasti Otce vlasti (1969)
Svatby pana Voka (1970)
Svět otevřený náhodám (1971)
Lupič Legenda (1972)
Hroch (1973)
Za volantem nepřítel (1974)
Tam, kde hnízdí čápi (1975)
Všichni proti všem (1977)
Pan Vok odchází (1979)
Hra o královnu (1980)
Každému jeho nebe (1981)
Příhody pana Příhody (1982)
Podivná přátelství herce Jesenia (1986)

References

External links

1903 births
1987 deaths
Czech film directors
Czechoslovak film directors
Directors of Golden Lion winners
Film directors from Prague